Cinebook Ltd is a British publishing company that publishes comic albums and graphic novels. It describes itself as "the 9th art publisher," the 9th art being comics in continental Europe, especially France, Belgium and Italy.

They typically translate Franco-Belgian comics – predominantly originating from the Franco-Belgian comic publishers Dargaud, Dupuis and Le Lombard – into English and have also issued an original series about the French Queen Marguerite de Valois, also known as Queen Margot. Cinebook works with a team of translators, including native speakers of French, British English and American English.

Titles

Softcover album series
So far, the company has published, or plans to publish, the following comic series in softcover editions:

Hardcover series
 Valerian: The Complete Collection

During 2017 and 2018 the British publisher Cinebook Limited published a hardcover collection of the series titled; Valerian: The Complete Collection, spread over seven volumes, with three to four stories in each book. These volumes are in full original color, printed on glossy paper and measure 220 mm × 290 mm.

In 2019 Cinebook launched a harcover book series collecting the complete output of Lucky Luke.
 Lucky Luke - The Complete Collection

Awards
Olivier Cadic was given the French National Order of Merit, according to the Birmingham Mail this award is:

A vindication of his work to make an important part of French culture available in the English-speaking world through Cinebook, as the ambassador himself noted when noting the publisher had now printed twice as many Lucky Luke books in the last three years as had been published in the previous fifty.

Censorship
A 2013 article from DowntheTubes.net discusses how Cinebook have been criticized for the fact that many of their releases are censored from the original works, a practice which usually affects comics which depict nudity, including books which in their original form were released for adult target audiences with an appropriate age rating.

Notes

References

External links
 

Comic book publishing companies of the United Kingdom
Publishing companies of the United Kingdom
2005 establishments in the United Kingdom
Companies established in 2005